Karavostasi is a town in Cyprus,  north of Lefka. It is under the de facto control of Northern Cyprus.

Karavostasi is home to the port of Gemikonağı, which was historically used for exporting copper but is inactive since 1992.

Before the conflict in Cyprus, Karavostasi had been a mixed village. Its name means "boat stop" in both Greek and Turkish.

See also
 Port of Gemikonağı

References

 
Communities in Nicosia District
Populated places in Lefke District